"Happy to Be on an Island in the Sun" is a song by Greek singer Demis Roussos. It was released as a single in 1975.

The song was included on Roussos' 1976 album Happy to Be....

Background and writing 
The song was written by David Lewis. The recording was produced by Georges Petsilas.

Commercial performance 
The single reached no. 5 in the UK.

Track listing 
7" single Philips 6042 033 (1975)
7" single RTB / Philips S-53.916 (1976, Yugoslavia)
 A. "Happy to Be on an Island in the Sun" (3:10)
 B. "Before" (2:52)

7" single Philips 6042 091 (1975, Germany)
 A. "Happy to Be on an Island in the Sun" (3:09)
 B. "Sing an Ode to Love" (4:07)

German version 

Roussos recorded a German version of this song (titled "Komm in den Garten der tausend Melodien", with German lyrics by Wolfgang Mürmann) on his 1976 German-language album Die Nacht und der Wein.

The recording was produced by Leo Leandros.

The version was in 1976 also released as single.

Track listing 
7" single "Komm in den Garten der tausend Melodien" Philips 6042 173 (1976, Germany)
 A. "Komm in den Garten der tausend Melodien" (3:17)
 B. "Ich hab das Glück gesehn" (3:46)

Charts

Certifications

References 

1975 songs
1975 singles
Demis Roussos songs
Philips Records singles